Tremandra stelligera  is a flowering plant in the family Elaeocarpaceae. It is a small upright shrub with pink, purple or blue flowers, dark green oval shaped leaves and is endemic to Western Australia.

Description
Flowering occurs from January to May or July to December.

Taxonomy and naming
Tremandra stelligera was first formally described in 1824 by Augustin Pyramus de Candolle from an unpublished description by Robert Brown and de Candolle's description was published in Prodromus Systematis Naturalis Regni Vegetabilis.The specific epithet (stelligera) is derived from the Latin stelliger  for "star-bearing" and "starry", referring to the stellate hairs.

Distribution and habitat
The species is found in the south-west corner of Western Australia in a variety of habitats on loam and sandy soils.

References

stelligera
Flora of Australia
Rosids of Western Australia